Ali Zaryab (born 27 December 1998) is a Pakistani cricketer. He made his first-class debut for Lahore Blues in the 2017–18 Quaid-e-Azam Trophy on 9 October 2017.

In December 2017, he was named in Pakistan's squad for the 2018 Under-19 Cricket World Cup. He was the leading run-scorer for Pakistan in the tournament, with 164 runs. He made his List A debut for Lahore Whites in the 2018–19 Quaid-e-Azam One Day Cup on 6 September 2018. In January 2021, he was named in Central Punjab's squad for the 2020–21 Pakistan Cup.

References

External links
 

1998 births
Living people
Pakistani cricketers
Lahore Blues cricketers
Lahore Whites cricketers
Central Punjab cricketers